Crown Point is a city in and the county seat of Lake County, Indiana, United States. The population was 33,899 at the 2020 census. The city was incorporated in 1868. On October 31, 1834, Solon Robinson and his family became the first settlers to an area that later became Crown Point. Due to its location, Crown Point is known as the "Hub of Lake County".

The city is surrounded by Merrillville to the north, Winfield to the east, Cedar Lake to the southwest, St. John to the west, and unincorporated Schererville to the northwest. The southern and southwestern parts of Crown Point border some unincorporated areas of Lake County.

History
On October 31, 1834, Solon Robinson and his family became the first settlers to stake a claim in the area that would eventually become Crown Point. In February 1837, Lake County was incorporated, with Liverpool, Indiana, as the county seat. Later that year, Solon Robinson funded a US$500 project to build a new wooden county courthouse in Crown Point, and the legislature was delighted to designate it as the county seat. It was not until 1868 that Crown Point was incorporated as a city.

In 1878, construction began on a new, larger county court house and clock tower. This new court house, now known as the Grand Old Lady, was built in the center of town and became the dominant feature of Crown Point (further additions to this courthouse would be made from 1907–1928). Campaigning for the presidency of the United States, William Jennings Bryan addressed a crowd from the steps of the court house in 1896. In 1897 a crowd of 4,000 gathered to watch a winning harness racing horse bred by noted Chicago theater manager Will J. Davis and his famous wife, contralto Jessie Bartlett Davis. The Davises bred trotters and dogs at their Crown Point farm c.1885-1917 (Chicago Daily Tribune, Aug 8, 1897, pg 7).  Crown Point was the site of the first Cobe Trophy automobile race, won by Louis Chevrolet in 1909.

The Old Lake County Courthouse was placed on the National Register of Historic Places in 1974, and the new Lake County Government Center opened on the north side of the city the next year.
 
Because Crown Point had no waiting period for marriage licenses, the city became a popular place for couples to marry; it became known as the "Marriage Mill". Many famous people came to Crown Point to marry, including Tom Mix, Rudolph Valentino, Muhammad Ali, and Jackson 5 patriarch Joseph Jackson and their wives.  Certain online sources claim that Ronald Reagan and Jane Wyman were married in Crown Point. But Reagan and Wyman were married in Glendale, California, according to sources such as Fox News, The Washington Post, and the Los Angeles Times.

The Walter Allman House, Wellington A. Clark House, Crown Point Courthouse Square Historic District, Lake County Courthouse, Lake County Tuberculosis Sanatorium, Nurses Home and Superintendent's House, Lake County Sheriff's House and Jail, Albert Maack House, and William Whitaker Landscape and House are listed on the National Register of Historic Places.

Locally designated residential historic districts include:
Sunnyside Historic District, includes St. Mary's Church and School and surrounding homes.
Holley Historic District, includes 20 homes and one church, including former Sheriff Lillian Holley's home at the southeast corner of South and East streets.

Gangster era

On March 3, 1934, FBI "Public Enemy #1" John Dillinger escaped from the "escape-proof" (as it was dubbed by local authorities at the time) Lake County Jail, which was guarded by many police and national guardsmen. Dillinger apparently escaped while brandishing a hand-carved wooden gun blackened with shoe polish, although this was disputed by some witnesses.  Dillinger further embarrassed the city, as well as the 42-year-old female Sheriff Lillian Holley, by driving off in her brand new V-8 Ford. The press augmented her chagrin with such headlines as: "Slim woman, mother of twins, controlled Dillinger as sheriff." Incensed, Holley declared at the time, "If I ever see John Dillinger again, I'll shoot him dead with my own gun. Don't blame anyone else for this escape. Blame me. I have no political career ahead of me and I don't care."  Furthermore, Holley made certain the Dillinger name would have no standing in Crown Point up until Holley's death in 1994 at 102.

Public Enemies (film)
In March 2008, a Universal Studios team, under the direction of Michael Mann, visited Crown Point to film parts of the movie Public Enemies at the former county jail facility from which Dillinger escaped. The crime drama is set during The Great Depression with the focus on FBI agent Melvin Purvis' attempt to stop criminals John Dillinger, Baby Face Nelson, and Pretty Boy Floyd. Christian Bale plays FBI agent Purvis, and Johnny Depp plays Dillinger. Actress Lili Taylor portrayed Sheriff Holley in the film. The shoot took three days to complete and involved a number of scenes inside the former Sheriff's house and jail.  A scene was constructed for filming the exterior. Depp was on the set for all three days and stayed late into the evenings each night to shake hands with hundreds of fans who stood for hours to see him and the film shoot. The movie was released in June 2009.

Geography
Crown Point lies on the Valparaiso Moraine.

Crown Point is situated approximately 40 miles southeast of Chicago's Loop.

Demographics

The estimated racial makeup of the city was 85.9% White, 8.0% African American, 0.1% Native American, 2.0% Asian, 2.6% from other races, and 1.3% from two or more races. Hispanic or Latino of any race were estimated to be 6.2% of the population.

The estimated median income for a household in the city in 2013 was $63,121 while the mean income for a household in the town was $78,090. Additionally, the median income for a family was $75,112 and the mean income for a family was $90,507. The estimated per capita income for the town was $31,177. About 4.3% of families and 7.0% of the population were estimated to be below the poverty line.

2010 census
As of the census of 2010, there were 27,317 people, 10,394 households, and 7,001 families residing in the city. The racial makeup of the city was 88.2% White, 6.3% African American, 0.2% Native American, 1.8% Asian, 1.9% from other races, and 1.6% from two or more races. Hispanic or Latino of any race were 8.1% of the population.

There were 10,394 households, of which 29.5% had children under the age of 18 living with them, 53.6% were married couples living together, 10.0% had a female householder with no husband present, 3.8% had a male householder with no wife present, and 32.6% were non-families. 27.5% of all households were made up of individuals, and 11.7% had someone living alone who was 65 years of age or older. The average household size was 2.45 and the average family size was 3.01.

The median age in the city was 39.6 years. 21.2% of residents were under the age of 18; 8% were between the ages of 18 and 24; 27.7% were from 25 to 44; 26.9% were from 45 to 64; and 16.1% were 65 years of age or older. The gender makeup of the city was 50.0% male and 50.0% female.

2000 census
As of the census of 2000, there were 19,806 people, 7,824 households, and 5,359 families residing in the city. The racial makeup of the city was 95.32% White, 1.41% African American, 0.18% Native American, 0.98% Asian, 0.04% Pacific Islander, 1.02% from other races, and 1.04% from two or more races. Hispanic or Latino of any race were 4.00% of the population.

There were 7,824 households, out of which 29.2% had children under the age of 18 living with them, 57.1% were married couples living together, 8.9% had a female householder with no husband present, and 31.5% were non-families. 27.3% of all households were made up of individuals, and 11.7% had someone living alone who was 65 years of age or older. The average household size was 2.45 and the average family size was 3.01.

In the city, the population was spread out, with 22.5% under the age of 18, 7.7% from 18 to 24, 27.2% from 25 to 44, 25.3% from 45 to 64, and 17.3% who were 65 years of age or older. The median age was 40 years. For every 100 females, there were 90.3 males. For every 100 females age 18 and over, there were 87.2 males.

The median income for a household in the city was $52,889, and the median income for a family was $64,274. Males had a median income of $50,090 versus $26,669 for females. The per capita income for the city was $24,568. About 2.1% of families and 3.7% of the population were below the poverty line, including 3.9% of those under age 18 and 3.2% of those age 65 or over.

Government
The government consists of a mayor and a city council. The interim mayor is Pete Land, the former chief of police . The city council consists of seven members. Five are elected from individual districts. Two are elected at-large.

Education
Crown Point residents who live in Center Township are served by the Crown Point Community School Corporation.  Residents who live in Ross Township are served by the Merrillville Community School Corporation.

Public schools in Crown Point are administered by the Crown Point Community School Corporation:
 Crown Point High School
 Robert A. Taft Middle School
 Colonel John Wheeler Middle School
 Timothy Ball Elementary School
 Eisenhower Elementary School
 Lake Street Elementary School
 Solon Robinson Elementary School
 Crossroads Alternative Achievement Center

Private schools:
 Pathway Christian School
 Trinity Lutheran School
 St. Mary Catholic Community School
 Avicenna Academy
Private Colleges:
Hyles-Anderson College
University of Saint Francis

Public library:
The city has a lending library, the Crown Point Community Public Library with two branches.

Transportation

Gary Public Transportation Corporation provides bus service along the 93rd Avenue corridor; however, there are plans to expand bus service within the city along the Broadway corridor from 93rd Avenue to the north terminating at US-231 to the south. These plans are known as the "Livable Broadway Plan" that aims to allow easy travel by public transportation between Gary, Merrillville, and Crown Point and to encourage transit-oriented development at each hub.

The Pennsylvania Railroad's Chicago to Columbus line and the Erie Lackawanna's Jersey City to Chicago line served Crown Point and had commuter service to and from Chicago. Both rail lines have been abandoned.

Lake County Court House
The old Lake County Court House is prominently situated in the center of Crown Point, which is commonly referred to simply as the square. The first portion of the court house was erected in 1878, with portions being added on all the way up to 1928. Inside the "Grand Old Lady", there are gift shops,a record shop, and a museum which is located on the second floor.

Lake County Fairgrounds

The Lake County Fairgrounds are located near the southern portion of Crown Point.  The fairgrounds include historic brick exhibition buildings, tree covered hills, rambling walking paths and a historic grandstand near the retired swimming area at Fancher Lake. The Crown Point Bridge, an 85-foot, single span Burr Arch Truss bridge, is the county's only covered bridge. It was originally built in 1878 near Milroy in Rush County and relocated to the northwest area of the fairgrounds over a gully in 1933.

Events
The Lake County Fair, the 2nd-largest county fair in the state of Indiana, is held on the fairgrounds each year in early August for 10 days. The Lake County Fair always boasts monster trucks, demolition derby, and an entire arena for horse shows.

The Corn Roast and the Taste of Crown Point, annual festivals featuring food and entertainment, are held downtown around the historic courthouse.

There are also parades held on Memorial Day, Independence Day, and St. Patrick's Day.

Notable people
 William G. Haan, World War I general
 Ambrose Stephen McDonald, Wisconsin state legislator and businessman
 Dan Plesac, Major League pitcher and MLB Network analyst
 Zach Plesac, Cleveland Indians pitcher
 Richie Roberts, wide receivers coach
 Jerry L. Ross, astronaut
 Thelma Strabel, novelist
 John Wheeler, Civil War officer
 Dean White, entrepreneur and billionaire
 Ralph H. Young, former head football coach at Michigan State
 Sasha Stefanovic, Purdue Basketball Guard

See also
Crown Point Police Department
Lake County, Indiana
Lake County Sheriff's Department
Indiana State Police

References

External links

City of Crown Point, Indiana website
Greater Crown Point Chamber of Commerce

Cities in Indiana
Populated places established in 1834
Cities in Lake County, Indiana
County seats in Indiana
Northwest Indiana
1834 establishments in Indiana